Platychorda is a genus of flowering plants belonging to the family Restionaceae.

Its native range is Southwestern Australia.

Species:

Platychorda applanata 
Platychorda rivalis

References

Restionaceae
Poales genera